The Steel Institute VDEh (German: Stahlinstitut VDEh) is a techno-economic organisation of the German steel industry headquartered in Düsseldorf, Germany. The institute was founded in 1860 as "Technical association for steelmaking" (Technischer Verein für Eisenhüttenwesen). Between 1880 and 2002, the association was called "Association of German steel manufacturers" (Verein Deutscher Eisenhüttenleute) or VDEh for short. In 2003, the name was changed to its present form "Steel institute VDEh" (Stahlinstitut VDEh), while retaining the old abbreviation VDEh as part of the name.

The Steel Institute VDEh is one of the largest steelmaking associations in the world. It has approximately 6600 members and 160 supporting companies. Its current president and CEO of the society are Hans-Jürgen Kerkhoff and Dr. Peter Dahlmann, respectively.

The association supports the development of steel technology and steel as a material through technical, techno-economical and scientific co-operation of engineers. It offers own training courses and co-operates with DIN e.V. in defining technical norms. The Steel Institute VDEh co-ordinates the joint research plans of its members and has its own research facilities through its participation in the VDEh-Betriebsforschungsinstitut (BFI) and the Max Planck Institute for Iron Research. The Steel Institute VDEh publishes technical reports, scientific journals and books through Verlag Stahleisen GmbH and maintains a technical library that is accessible to the public. The three specialist journals – stahl und eisen, MPT International and stahlmarkt – are printed and also available as mobile tablet apps and e-papers on the internet. The new stahl und eisen INTERNATIONAL is only published electronically (four issues per year).

The Steel Institute VDEh has been involved in the standardisation of steel products for over a hundred years. The offices of the Normenausschuss Eisen und Stahl (FES) (the Committee for Iron and Steel Standardisation) are associated with the VDEh regarding their organisation, financing and personnel. The FES specialists elaborate standards in the area of steel and iron according to the rules of the 
Deutsches Institut für Normung (DIN) (The German Institute for Standardisation).

References

 Helmut Maier, Andreas Zilt, Manfred Rasch (eds.): 150 Jahre Stahlinstitut VDEh 1860–2010. Klartext, Essen 2010, .
 Hans Bodo Lüngen: The Steel Institute VDEh  – technical expertise for steel in Europe. Heat Processing, No. 1, 2015.
 Peter Dahlmann, Hans Bodo Lüngen: Das Stahlinstitut VDEh – technische Kompetenz für Stahl in Europa. gaswärme international, No. 3, 2014.
 Steel Institute VDEh: Annual report of Steel Institute VDEh 2013, Steel Institute VDEh, Düsseldorf, June 2014.
 VDEh-Betriebsforschungsinstitut: Tätigkeitsbericht / Activity Report 2011/2012, VDEh-Betriebsforschungsinstitut GmbH, 2013.
 T. Henke, A. Oldewurtel: Stahl-Eisen-Weststoffblatt (SEW) 220, Supplementary Information on the most important tool steels, Proceedings of the 6th International Tooling Conference, 2002.
 Karl-Eugen Kurrer: The History of the Theory of Structures - From Arch Analysis to Computational Mechanics. Ernst & Sohn Verlag für Architektur und technische Wissenschaften GmbH & Co. KG, Berlin, Germany.

Websites 
 Website of the Steel Institute VDEh
 Website of the VDEh-Betriebsforschungsinstitut (BFI)
 Website of the Verlag Stahleisen GmbH

1860 establishments in Germany